Hacımuslu can refer to:

 Hacımuslu, Kurşunlu
 Hacımuslu, Polatlı